Glyphodes bivitralis is a moth of the family Crambidae described by Achille Guenée in 1854. It is native to south-east Asia, including Hong Kong, India, Japan, Taiwan and Thailand. It is also found in Queensland, Hawaii and Maldives.

The wingspan is about 30 mm. The forewings are brown with white patches and the hindwings are white with a broad brown margin.

The larvae feed on Erythrina speciosa,  Ficus variolosa, Ficus elastica and Ficus microcarpa (Moraceae). They live in a shelter made by curling a leaf of the host plant with silk. Young larvae are green with black markings and four black spots. Older larvae turn brown, but retain the black markings.

References

External links

Moths described in 1854
Glyphodes
Moths of Japan